Lady Lee Steere may refer to:
Catherine Anne Lee Steere, wife of Sir James George Lee Steere (1830-1903)
 Bridget Yelverton Lee Steere (1884-1979), Girl Guides leader and wife of Sir Ernest Augustus Lee Steere (1866-1957)
 Jessica Lee Steere (died 2001), wife of Sir Ernest Henry Lee-Steere (1912-2011)